Karl Diehl may refer to:

 Karl Ludwig Diehl (1896–1958), German film actor
 Karl Diehl (economist) (1864–1943), German economist and professor

See also
 Carl Diehl (1904–1997), American college football player
 Diehl (disambiguation)